Marc Émile Pierre Adolphe Tiffeneau (November 5, 1873 – May 20, 1945) was a French chemist who co-discovered the Tiffeneau-Demjanov rearrangement.

In 1899 he graduated from the École de pharmacie de Paris, and afterwards began work as a pharmacy intern in Paris hospitals. In 1904 he was named chief pharmacist at the Hôpital Boucicaut, and from 1927, worked in a similar capacity at the Hôtel-Dieu de Paris. From 1926 to 1944 he was a professor of pharmacology to the faculty of medicine at the Sorbonne.

He also sat as one of the four members of the Drug Supervisory Body (predecessor of the International Narcotics Control Board) from 1933 until his death.

Tiffeneau received his Ph.D in sciences in 1907 and his Ph.D in medicine in 1910. He was a member of the Académie Nationale de Médecine (from 1927), dean to the faculty of medicine (1937) and a member of the Académie des Sciences (from 1939). At the time of his death in 1945 he was president of the Société chimique de France.

Selected works 
 Le système nerveux autonome sympathique et parasympathique, 1923; (translation of John Newport Langley).
 Abrégé de pharmacologie, 1926, 7th edition 1947.
 Les Amines biologiques, 1934; (preface by Tiffeneau).
 Vade-mecum de médecine pratique, 1940.

References
 
 

1873 births
1945 deaths
20th-century French chemists
French pharmacists
Members of the French Academy of Sciences
Academic staff of the University of Paris
People from Oise
Officiers of the Légion d'honneur